Michael Alexander Juhl Røn (born 25 July 1984 in Århus) is a Danish-born Norwegian footballer who play for Kråkerøy.

He joined Sparta in 2008, having previously played for Fredrikstad FK in the Norwegian Premier League. Before joining Fredrikstad he played for Borgen IL and Borg Fotball; he also had a spell for Drøbak-Frogn IL.

Outside of football he is a student at Østfold University College.

In July 2013 he decide to step down on football, because he had some injury during his time in Sarpsborg 08

Career statistics

References

Profile on Sarpsborg Sparta website

1984 births
Living people
Norwegian footballers
Norwegian people of Danish descent
Fredrikstad FK players
Drøbak-Frogn IL players
Sarpsborg 08 FF players
Norwegian First Division players
Eliteserien players
Association football midfielders